Calpurnius Flaccus was a rhetorician who lived in the reign of Hadrian, and whose fifty-one declamations frequently accompany those of Quintilian. They were first published by Pierre Pithou in Paris in 1580. Pliny the Younger writes to Flaccus, who, in some editions, is called Calpurnius Flaccus.

See also 
 Gaius Calpurnius Flaccus

References

Smith, William (editor); Dictionary of Greek and Roman Biography and Mythology, "Flaccus, Calpurnius", Boston, (1867)

2nd-century Romans
2nd-century writers
Ancient Roman rhetoricians
Silver Age Latin writers
Flaccus